Thakins and the Struggle for National Independence (1930–1948) is a book by Tekkatho Sein Tin, first published in 2009. This book includes biographies of several key leaders of Dobama Asiayone, a 1930s Burmese nationalist organization dedicated to overturn the British rule in Burma.

Publication
According to the author, he wrote book at the urging Thakin Khin Nyunt, founder of Sarpay Lawka Book Center. A few surviving members of Dobama Asiayone including Thakin San Hlaing, Thakin Chit Maung (Widura), Thakin Khin Aung, Thakin Chit (Daydaye), Thakin Thein Pe (Wakema).

Contents
The book contains biographies of the following:

Elders of Dobama Asiayone
Thakin Kodaw Hmaing
Thakin Maung Gyi
Thakin Soe Thein

Presidents
Thakin Ba Thaung
Thakin Ba Sein
Thakin Lay Maung
Thakin Thein Maung Gyi
Thakin Tun Oke
Thakin Mya

Secretary
Thakin Aung San

References 

Burmese-language books
Books about Myanmar
2009 non-fiction books
Books about politics of Burma